Carmelo Bossi (15 October 1939 – 23 March 2014) was an Italian boxer who was the undisputed super welterweight champion of the world. Bossi boxed from 1961 to 1971 and his overall record was 40 wins (10 KOs), 8 defeats and 3 draws.

Career 
Bossi won a silver medal at the 1960 Olympics. In early 1961 he turned professional and fought through 1971. In 1965 Bossi won the national and in 1967 the European welterweight title. After defending the European title twice he lost it on 14 August 1968 to Fighting Mack. In 1967 he twice fought Willie Ludick for the world welterweight title (South African Version), but lost on both occasions. In July 1970 he took the Lineal, WBC and WBA super welterweight titles by defeating Freddie Little, but lost them to Koichi Wajima in October 1971 in his last bout.

Professional boxing record

See also
List of world light-middleweight boxing champions

References

External links

Carmelo Bossi - CBZ Profile

1939 births
2014 deaths
Boxers at the 1960 Summer Olympics
Medalists at the 1960 Summer Olympics
Olympic boxers of Italy
Olympic medalists in boxing
Olympic silver medalists for Italy
Boxers from Milan
Italian male boxers
European Boxing Union champions
World Boxing Association champions
World Boxing Council champions
Welterweight boxers
Light-middleweight boxers
World light-middleweight boxing champions